Umjesto gluposti ("Instead of Stupidity") is the second album of Miladin Šobić, released by Diskoton in 1982.

Track listing 
 Đon (Sole) - Video of a song
 Cipele nove (New Shoes)
 Umjesto gluposti (Instead of Stupidity)
 Opet krivi tip (Wrong Type Again)
 Svetozara Markovića 39 
 Hram ljubavi (Temple of Love)
 Nevjernice (Traitress)
 Četa luđaka (Crew of Lunatics)
 Željezničke tuge (Railway Sorrows)
 Ne pokušavaj mjenjat' me (Don't Try Changin' Me)

See also 
SFR Yugoslav Pop and Rock scene

1982 albums